The đàn sến (chữ Nôm: 彈𬃤) is a Vietnamese plucked string instrument with two strings and a slender neck with raised frets.  It is derived from the Chinese qinqin and is used primarily in the traditional music of southern Vietnam.

References

External links
Đàn sến page
Đàn sến photo

See also
Traditional Vietnamese musical instruments

Vietnamese musical instruments